National Highway 42 (NH 42), (previously part of old National Highways 205 and 219), is a major National Highway in India, that runs in the states of Andhra Pradesh and Tamil Nadu. The northern terminal is at the National Highway 44 junction south of Anantapur inside Andhra Pradesh state and the southern terminal is at the National Highway 44 junction near Krishnagiri in Tamil Nadu.

Route 

In Andhra Pradesh, it passes through Anantapur, Kadiri, Madanapalle, Punganur and Kuppam. In Tamil Nadu, it connects Krishnagiri with its junction with NH 44.

Route length in states:
 Andhra Pradesh – 
 Tamil Nadu –

Junctions  

  near Kuderu
  near Anantapur
  near KADIRI
  near Kurabalakota
  near Madanapalle
  near Palamaneru
  near Venkatagirikota
  near Krishnagiri
  Terminal near Krishnagiri

See also 
 List of National Highways in India
 List of National Highways in India by state

References

External links
 NH 42 on OpenStreetMap

National highways in India
42
42